Chilcayoc (possibly from Quechua ch'illka baccharis, -yuq a suffix to indicate possession, "the one that has got baccharis" or "the one with baccharis") is a volcano in the Andes of Peru, about  high. It is situated in the "Valley of the Volcanoes"  in the Arequipa Region, Castilla Province, Andagua District. Chilcayoc lies west of the Chachas Lake and north of the volcano Jechapita.

References

Volcanoes of Peru
Mountains of Arequipa Region
Mountains of Peru
Landforms of Arequipa Region